Visa requirements for Tunisian citizens are administrative entry restrictions by the authorities of other states placed on citizens of Tunisia. As of 13 April 2021, Tunisian citizens had visa-free or visa on arrival access to 71 countries and territories, ranking the Tunisian passport 74th in terms of travel freedom according to the Henley Passport Index.

Visa requirements map

Visa requirements

Dependent, Disputed, or Restricted territories
Unrecognized or partially recognized countries

Dependent and autonomous territories

See also

 Visa policy of Tunisia
 Tunisian passport

References and Notes
References

Notes

Tunisia
Foreign relations of Tunisia